Rodney Leslie Adams (born 15 September 1945) is an English former professional footballer who played in the Football League for Bournemouth & Boscombe Athletic as a winger.

His early football was played for Foxhill Rangers based at Foxhill, Bath where he lived. He joined Bournemouth from non-league Frome Town for a transfer fee of £500.

He joined Weymouth, where he made 339 appearances in all competitions, including 28 as substitute. While at Weymouth off the field he was an accounts clerk for Devenish Brewery. Now resident in Vancouver, Canada. His father Les was a non-league footballer in Bath.

References
General
. Retrieved 28 October 2013.
Specific

1945 births
Living people
Sportspeople from Bath, Somerset
English footballers
Association football wingers
Frome Town F.C. players
AFC Bournemouth players
Weymouth F.C. players
Yeovil Town F.C. players
English Football League players
Southern Football League players